Chapter 17 of the 1997 Constitution of Fiji is named "Schedule Oaths and Affirmations."  It is the last chapter of the Constitution.  It sets out oaths and oaths of offices to be taken by politicians of Fiji.

Oath or Affirmation of Allegiance
Part 1 of Chapter 17 sets out the oath of allegiance.  It has a person state that he or she is "faithful" to the republic, and faithful "according to law."  The oath ends with the statement "So help me God!"

In 2006, Fiji experienced a coup.  The Prime Minister of New Zealand Helen Clark argued that the coup should be resisted by citizens, pointing to the oath of allegiance: "You owe it to your oath of allegiance to the Fiji constitution to act to stop this act of mutiny," she said.

Part 2
Part 2 gives the oath and affirmation for the President of Fiji and the Vice-President of Fiji.  The oath and affirmation refer to service to the republic from the President's office or Vice-President's office.  This oath also ends with "So help me God!"

Part 3
An oath for a cabinet minister in the Cabinet of Fiji is given in Part 3.  This oath would be taken by the Prime Minister of Fiji, the Attorney-General Minister of Fiji, or an Assistant Minister.  It refers to using the "best... judgment" and advising the President when mandated to do so.  This advice, according to the oath, must not be revealed.

Part 4
The last Part of Chapter 17 contains oaths for those holding office in the judiciary of Fiji.  This oath also refers to service to the republic, and to upholding the Constitution.

References

1997 Constitution of Fiji
Oaths
Fiji